Rúben Alexandre Pires Dionísio (born 7 July 1995) is a Portuguese professional footballer who plays as a goalkeeper for S.C. Olhanense.

Career
Born in Cascais, Lisbon District, Dionisio signed his first professional contract for two years at G.D. Estoril Praia in June 2014. He made one appearance in Primeira Liga, playing the final three minutes of the season on 23 May 2015 in a 2–0 home win over Boavista F.C. after replacing Paweł Kieszek.

In July 2019, he was signed by S.C. Olhanense.

References

External links

Portuguese League profile 

1995 births
Living people
Sportspeople from Cascais
Portuguese footballers
Association football goalkeepers
Primeira Liga players
Segunda Divisão players
G.D. Estoril Praia players
S.R. Almancilense players
S.U. Sintrense players
S.C. Olhanense